The Big Exchange is a 1992 Russian-American comedy film directed by Georgiy Shengeliya.

Plot 
The plot centers on the 1961 monetary reform in the Soviet Union, which involved denomination of all currency 10:1; conspicuously, the copper kopecks (1/100 of a ruble) were excluded from the exchange due to the expense of re-minting them, effectively becoming 10 times as valuable. The protagonists of the movie are tasked by a Soviet government functionary (who is also a secret millionaire) to enact a get-rich scheme which involves them touring the country and exchanging the old paper banknotes, soon to be on their way out, for small copper coins. The film then deals with their misadventures on the road.

Cast 
 Vladimir Ilyin as Babaskin
 Andrey Ponomaryov as Dzhora Grakin
 Vadim Zakharchenko as Ignatyevich
 Yuri Gorin
 Valentina Telichkina as Zoya Aleksandrovna
 Oksana Mysina as Lenochka Grakina
 Renat Davletyarov as First persecutor
 Nail Idrisov as Second persecutor
 Oleg Durygin as Third persecutor
 Alla Meshcheryakova as Serafima Maksimovna

References

External links 
 

1992 films
1990s Russian-language films
Russian comedy films
American comedy films
Films set in 1961
Films set in Crimea
Films set in the Soviet Union
1992 comedy films
1990s American films